Marina Kravchenko (born May 19, 1975 in Soviet Union) is a champion Israeli table tennis player.  She is Jewish.  She participated in the Olympics in 2004.

See also
List of select Jewish table tennis players

References

External links
 
 Marina Kravchenko at the Jewish Virtual Library

1975 births
Living people
Israeli table tennis players
Jewish table tennis players
Olympic table tennis players of Israel
Table tennis players at the 2004 Summer Olympics
Ukrainian Jews
Ukrainian female table tennis players